Julien Michel Leiris (20 April 1901 in Paris – 30 September 1990 in Saint-Hilaire, Essonne) was a French surrealist writer and ethnographer. Part of the Surrealist group in Paris, Leiris became a key member of the College of Sociology with Georges Bataille and head of research in ethnography at the CNRS.

Biography
Michel Leiris obtained his baccalauréat in philosophy at the Lycée Janson de Sailly in 1918 and after a brief attempt at studying chemistry, he developed a strong interest in jazz and poetry. Between 1921 and 1924, Leiris met a number of important figures such as Max Jacob, Georges Henri Rivière, Jean Dubuffet, Robert Desnos, Georges Bataille and the artist André Masson, who soon became his mentor. Through Masson, Leiris became a member of the Surrealist movement, contributed to La Révolution surréaliste, published Simulacre (1925), and Le Point Cardinal (1927), and wrote a surrealist novel Aurora (1927–28; first published in 1946). In 1926, he married Louise Godon, the stepdaughter of Picasso's art dealer Daniel-Henry Kahnweiler and traveled to Egypt and Greece.

Following a falling-out with the surrealist leader André Breton in 1929, Leiris contributed an essay to the anti-Breton pamphlet Un Cadavre, and joined Bataille's team as a sub-editor for Documents, to which he also regularly contributed articles such as “Notes on Two Microcosmic Figures of the 14th and 15th Centuries” (1929, issue 1), “In Connection with the ‘Musée des Sorciers'" (1929, issue 2), "Civilisation" (1929, issue 4), “The ‘Caput Mortuum’ or the Alchemist's Wife” (1930, issue 8), and on artists such as Giacometti, Miró, Picasso, and the 16th Century painter Antoine Caron. He also wrote an article on “The  Ethnographer’s Eye (concerning the Dakar-Djibouti mission)” before setting off in 1930 as the secretary-archivist in Marcel Griaule's ambitious ethnographic expedition. From this experience, Leiris published his first important book in 1934, L’Afrique fantôme, combining both an ethnographic study and an autobiographical project, which broke with the traditional ethnographic writing style of Griaule. Upon his return, he started his practice as an ethnographer at the Musée de l'Homme, a position he kept until 1971.

In 1937, Leiris teamed up with Bataille and Roger Caillois to found the Collège de sociologie in response to the current international situation. Increasingly involved in politics, he took part in a mission to Côte d'Ivoire in the French colonies, in 1945. As a member of Jean-Paul Sartre's editorial committee for Les Temps modernes, Leiris was involved in a series of political struggles, including the Algerian War, and was one of the first to sign the Déclaration sur le droit à l'insoumission dans la guerre d'Algérie, the 1960 manifesto supporting the fight against the colonial forces in Algeria.

In 1961, Leiris was made head of research in ethnography at the C.N.R.S. (Centre national de la recherche scientifique) and published numerous critical texts on artists he admired, including Francis Bacon, a close friend for whom he had modeled. That year he also published Nights as Day, Days as Night (Eng. translation, Spurl Editions, 2017).

Considered a  leading figure in 20th century French literature, sociology, and cultural criticism, Michel Leiris left a considerable number of works.  These range from autobiographical works such as L'Age  d'homme (1939), La Règle du jeu (1948–1976) and his Journal 1922-1989 (published postmortem in 1992); art criticism such as Au verso des images (1980) and Francis Bacon face et profil (1983); music criticism such as Operratiques (1992); and scientific contributions such as La Langue secrète des Dogons de Saga (1948) and Race et civilisation (1951). (His fields of interest in anthropology ranged from bullfighting to possession in Gondar, Ethiopia.)

With Jean Jamin, Leiris founded Gradhiva, a journal of anthropology in 1986. The journal is now the journal of anthropology and museology of the Musée du quai Branly (Paris, France).

Leiris was also a talented poet, and poetry was important in his approach to the world. In the preface to Haut Mal, suivi de Autres Lancers (Gallimard 1969) he is quoted as saying that "the practice of poetry enables us to posit the Other as an equal" and that poetic inspiration is "a very rare thing, a fleeting gift from Heaven, to which the poet needs to be, at the price of an absolute purity, receptive – and to pay with his unhappiness for the benefits derived from this blessing."

Works (selection)

See also
 Limit-experience

References 

 Jean-Louis de Rambures, "Comment travaillent les écrivains", Paris 1978 (interview with M. Leiris, in French)

External links
 
 

1901 births
1990 deaths
Writers from Paris
Ethnographers
French surrealist writers
Lycée Janson-de-Sailly alumni
Analysands of Adrien Borel
Burials at Père Lachaise Cemetery
20th-century French poets
French male poets
Surrealist poets
20th-century French male writers